Nanarsine is a genus of erebid moths, first described by Volynkin in 2019.

Species 

 Nanarsine emiks (Černý, 2009)
 Nanarsine milani (Černý, 2009)
 Nanarsine porphyrea (Hampson, 1900)
 Nanarsine postalba (Fang, 1986)
 Nanarsine semilutea (Wileman, 1911)
 Nanarsine senara (Moore, 1859)
 Nanarsine sullia (Swinhoe, 1901)

References 

Moth genera
Nudariina
Moths described in 2019